Brendan Jacob Joel Fehr (born October 29, 1977) is a Canadian film and television actor, perhaps best known for portraying Michael Guerin in the WB television series Roswell,  and for portraying lab tech Dan Cooper in CSI: Miami. In 2008, Fehr won a Gemini Award for "Hottest Canadian Male TV Star". Fehr also played Jared Booth in the Fox television series Bones. He has had numerous film roles.

Early life
Fehr was born October 29, 1977, in New Westminster, British Columbia, to a mother who worked as a correctional case manager and a father who was a yacht manufacturer. He moved to Winnipeg, Manitoba in 1990, and was raised as a strict Russian Mennonite. He graduated in 1995 from Mennonite Brethren Collegiate Institute.

Career
Fehr has modeled for Levi's, Calvin Klein, Emporio Armani, and DKNY Jeans, and his pictures appeared in magazines. Fehr broke into television in 1997 when he was cast in Breaker High. He enjoyed a regular role on the Sci-Fi TV series Roswell from 1999 to 2002. In 2001, Fehr starred in the U2 video "Stuck in a Moment You Can't Get Out Of". He plays a rookie football player named Paul Hewson (Bono's real name), who blows what would have been the game winning kick in an American football game as the ball hit the goal post. Fehr also appeared in Vanessa Carlton's video "Pretty Baby".

In 2008, Fehr starred as Jake Stanton in the ABC mini-series Samurai Girl, and had a recurring role as the character Jared Booth on Bones. In 2009 he had a recurring role as Cole, a criminalist in CSI: Miami TV series. In 2011, Fehr played a businessman in A Christmas Kiss and the navigator of a U.S. warship in the movie X-Men First Class. He also guest-starred in two episodes of Nikita (TV series).

In 2014, Fehr began playing the role of Dr. Drew Alister, an Army vet and surgeon at a San Antonio hospital, in the NBC drama The Night Shift. The show aired for four seasons, ending in 2017.

Personal life
Fehr was in a relationship with, and was engaged to, his Roswell costar and onscreen love interest Majandra Delfino between 2001 and 2006. He currently lives in Los Angeles, California and Albuquerque, New Mexico with his wife, Jennifer Rowley, whom he married in July 2006. The couple have three daughters: James Olivia (b. 2008), Ellison Jane (b. 2011) and Ondine Carda Kitty (b. 2013).

Filmography

Film

Television

Awards and nominations
Saturn Award
2001: Nominated, "Best Supporting Actor on Television" – Roswell

Gemini Award
2008: Won, "Hottest Canadian Male Star"

Genie Award
2005: Nominated, "Best Performance by an Actor in a Supporting Role"

Teen Choice Awards
2000: Nominated, "Choice Sidekick" – Roswell
2001: Nominated, "Choice Sidekick" – Roswell

References

External links

 
 

1977 births
20th-century Canadian male actors
21st-century Canadian male actors
Canadian expatriate male actors in the United States
Canadian male film actors
Canadian male television actors
Canadian Mennonites
Living people
Male actors from British Columbia
Male actors from Winnipeg
People from New Westminster